Stay with Me Till Morning is a 1970 novel by the British writer John Braine.

In 1981 it was adapted into a three-part television series by the same name. Produced by Yorkshire Television it starred Nanette Newman and Keith Barron.

References

Bibliography
Baskin, Ellen. Serials on British Television, 1950-1994. Scolar Press, 1996.
 Stringer, Jenny & Sutherland, John. The Oxford Companion to Twentieth-century Literature in English. Oxford University Press, 1996.

1970 British novels
Novels by John Braine
British novels adapted into television shows
Eyre & Spottiswoode books